Yu Hao (born 5 September 1997) is a Chinese footballer who currently plays for Shanghai SIPG in the Chinese Super League.

Club career
Yu Hao joined Chinese Super League side Shanghai SIPG's youth academy in November 2014 when Shanghai SIPG bought Shanghai Luckystar's youth team. He was promoted to the first team squad by Sven-Göran Eriksson in the summer break of 2016 season. On 18 April 2018, Yu made his senior debut in a 2–1 away defeat to Melbourne Victory in the last group match of 2018 AFC Champions League. He made his league debut on 17 July 2018 in a 1–1 away draw against Shandong Luneng Taishan, coming on as a substitute for Cai Huikang in the 84th minute.

Career statistics
.

Honours

Club
Shanghai SIPG
Chinese Super League: 2018
Chinese FA Super Cup: 2019

References

External links
 

1997 births
Living people
Chinese footballers
Footballers from Shanghai
Shanghai Port F.C. players
Chinese Super League players
Association football defenders